Otto Michtits (born 20 June 1928) was an Austrian boxer. He competed in the men's light heavyweight event at the 1948 Summer Olympics.

References

1928 births
Living people
Austrian male boxers
Olympic boxers of Austria
Boxers at the 1948 Summer Olympics
Place of birth missing (living people)
Light-heavyweight boxers
20th-century Austrian people